Steve Fork is a stream in the U.S. states of California and Oregon. It is a tributary to Carberry Creek.

Steve Fork was named in the 1870s after one Stephen Oster.

References

Rivers of California
Rivers of Oregon
Rivers of Jackson County, Oregon
Rivers of Josephine County, Oregon
Rivers of Siskiyou County, California